Gladiators is a British television sports entertainment game show. An adaptation of the American programme and its format, American Gladiators, and was produced by LWT for ITV and broadcast from 10 October 1992 to 1 January 2000.

The programme's format sees four contestants, two male and two female, compete in a series of physical events against the show's "Gladiators", eventually competing in one final event, with contestants aiming to secure a place in the grand final and be crowned champion for their respective series. There were no prizes awarded to the winner in any episode, until the final. The show was presented by Ulrika Jonsson throughout its original run, alongside John Fashanu (1992–96, 1999–2000) and Jeremy Guscott (1997–98), with John Sachs providing commentary on each event, and John Anderson refereeing the contests. A group of cheerleaders also accompanied the show, known as the "G-Force".

The success of the British series spawned further adaptations in Australia and other countries, while a children's spin-off version for the UK, entitled Gladiators: Train 2 Win, was also created and broadcast on CITV between September 1995 and March 1998 and a series of live arena shows. A revival of Gladiators was produced for Sky 1 and aired between May 2008 and October 2009. A second revival is set to be broadcast on BBC One and BBC iPlayer in 2023.

Format 
The series involves contestants battling against a 'Gladiator' in a number of events to secure points for the final event, The Eliminator. Typically, four contenders would appear in each episode, two male (Red and Blue) and two female (Pink and Yellow), and each contender would compete in five or six events, depending on the series or time constraints.

In each event, the contenders will score a number of points, usually ten for a win. Typically, both male and female contenders would compete in the same events; however, during series six, this format was removed, and female contenders would play easier games, whilst the male contenders would play more difficult games. Once all five or six games are played, the number of points is totalled and the contestant with the highest number of points gets a headstart in The Eliminator assault course with every point ahead of their competitor worth half a second. The winner of The Eliminator then goes on to compete in the next round.

A typical series contains 15 episodes – eight heats, four quarter finals, two semi-finals and the grand final, apart from the first series, which consisted of nine episodes - six heats, two semi-finals and a grand final. Occasionally, a celebrity or charity special will be broadcast after the grand final. Mini series, such as the final season (series 8), would consist of three episodes - two heats and a grand final, whilst the two International series consisted of seven episodes - four heats, two semi-finals and a grand final.

Events 

Despite being made by London Weekend Television, all episodes of Gladiators, International Gladiators, the second series of The Ashes and the first series of Springbok Challenge were recorded at the National Indoor Arena in Birmingham, whose ITV provider was Central Television. The first series of The Ashes and The Springbok Challenge II were filmed at the locations of the Australian and South African series respectively.

After series one, which had 6 events always in the same order; Atlaspheres, The Wall, Danger Zone, Swingshot, Hang Tough and Duel, the line-up changed from series to series, with new events being added every year and randomised. However 2 events never made it onto the televised show (Breakthrough & Conquer and Cyclotron). Over the years some were dropped due to safety reasons (Tilt, Joust, Pole-Axe and Pyramid) although the latter 2 returned with safety modifications and one just disappeared without any explanation despite being both popular with viewers and was not known to have caused any injuries (Pursuit).

Cast and crew

Presenters 
Over the course of the 8 domestic series, Gladiators had 3 main presenters. Former TV-am weather presenter Ulrika Jonsson was with the show from the first episode and in many ways was the main anchor due to her TV background. Despite having no hosting experience, footballer John Fashanu was given the role of male host of the series. For Series 6 and 7 he was replaced by rugby player Jeremy Guscott.

The Gladiators 

In 1999, James Crossley (also known as Hunter) was crowned "The Ultimate Gladiator" in Battle Of The Giants, the penultimate episode of the final series.

Both Cobra and Lightning were never originally intended to be Gladiators. Instead, they trained and entered as contestants, and it wasn't until hours before the first recording that it was decided two more Gladiators would be required for the series. This is the reason neither appear on the cover of the music CD that was released to accompany the series. They were both upgraded to full-time participants in show three, and both remained until the very end of the programme.

Saracen originally auditioned to be a contestant. After stunning producers in training, he was offered a role on the main Gladiator team.

Fox originally appeared as a contestant during the Wembley live shows of 1993. She was hand-picked to be a reserve Gladiator for the sixth series, however, she ended up becoming a full-time participant after Gold injured herself during training. When the British series ended, Fox became a member of the South African Gladiators team, appearing in their final domestic season.

Laser originally trained and entered as a contender but was later made into a reserve Gladiator due to several Female Gladiators being unable to compete due to ongoing injury problems. She later ended up becoming a full-time Gladiator, even appearing in the Second Ashes series.

Vulcan joined the British Gladiators series after his native Australian edition of the series was cancelled. In international Gladiators 2 and both Ashes competitions, he competed for Australia.

Wolf later became the team coach for the new set of Gladiators, who appeared in the 2008 revival of the series.

Diesel and Vulcan only participated in the "Battle of the Giants" special in season 8.

Contenders 
Applicants who wanted to take part in the show had to go through rigorous fitness tests before they were selected to take part. Footage of several of the tests was broadcast during behind-the-scenes segments during both the first and second series.

Notable competitors on the show include future British 400-metre hurdler Chris Rawlinson, Wales International Rugby Union winger Glen Webbe, female wrestler Non Evans (who appeared only once during the sixth series) and cage fighter Alex Reid during the seventh series.

Most competitors achieved brief local fame, but series three women's champion Eunice Huthart earned great recognition, and briefly presented late night television before becoming Angelina Jolie's stunt double in Hollywood films. Several competitors from the show's history later went on to appear on Total Wipeout, the most notable being series seven contestants Colm Curran and Micah Hudson.

Series 5 winner Mark Mottram went on to become a professional stuntman and was Pierce Brosnan's stunt double in the James Bond films. He appeared in Batman (as Heath Ledger's double). He is married to Debbie Carpeter Mottram, who was a cheerleader he met on Gladiators. Series 1 winner Weininger Irwin appeared in the BBC Two series Back in Time for Brixton in November 2016, in which a family experience 50 years of black British history; in one episode, he and his family watched his victory in the first series final.

Champions

Sam Codjoe reached the series 3 final. However he was injured at the beginning of Powerball, the fourth game of the night, as a result of a mistimed tackle from Shadow and was replaced by Phil Campbell (whom he defeated in his semi-final). The £2,000 runner up cheque was equally split between the two as both were deemed to have competed in three games.

John Anderson 

John Anderson has been the head official. Before every event he called: "Contender ready! Gladiator ready!. " similar to his American counterpart, Larry Thompson, but he added a countdown, "Three! Two! One!" before starting the game. During celebrity specials Anderson took a more light-hearted attitude to the show such as adapting his call to "Little contender ready!" when Willie Carson took part.

John had an assistant on the show, known as the "Official Timekeeper". The role was predominately filled by Andrew Norgate, who was also an associate producer, from the second series on 18 September 1993 to the eighth series on 1 January 2000. Norgate was replaced by athlete Derek Redmond for series 3 (1994) and Eugene Gilkes for series 6 (1997) and also for the 1998 Springbok Challenge series; his arch-nemesis is male gladiator Wolf.

Children's spin-off 

In the late 1990s, when the popularity of the programme began to wane, a spin-off entitled Gladiators: Train 2 Win was produced and was broadcast on CITV in 1996, based on Gladiators 2000, the children's version of American Gladiators. The show featured two teams of children, each captained by a gladiator (varying each week) which sought to gain the most points. Some of the games differed from those on the parent show; for example, the "Eliminator" round was more similar to the "Pursuit" round (though it still featured the famous "Travelator").

Controversies

 During the first season in 1992, on the first game of The Wall, Contender Nicola Bawden slipped away from Scorpio (Nikki Diamond). Scorpio had managed to get hold of her, but she slipped off moments later and dropped to the floor. It turned out that Bawden had greased her legs. It also turned out that Bawden had undone her laces so that Scorpio could not hold onto her trainers. Although this wasn't explored on the actual programme, the incident was given a mention on the show's first home video release, Into the Arena, as Scorpio made a complaint. After reviewing the footage, referee John Anderson ruled that while Bawden did use excessive grease on her legs there was no actual rule prohibiting this therefore she was allowed to retain the points she had earned. However Anderson also said that Bawden's actions were not in the spirit of competition, and so new rules were immediately put in place to prevent her or any other contestants from trying the same trick. Scorpio was shown to be unhappy with the referee's ruling and with Bawden's apparent lack of sportsmanship, but when Bawden advanced to the semi-final Scorpio would get another chance to pull her off the wall and was successful on her second attempt.
 After the Wembley live shows in 1993, Phoenix (Sandy Young), Flame (Kimbra LeAnne Standish) and Hawk (Aleks Georgijev) were sacked from the show, having received the lowest number of votes from fans in a magazine poll. Series director Nigel Lythgoe was heavily criticised for the decision and was slammed by TV critics for such ruthlessness. For reasons unknown, Bullit (Mike Harvey), who also appeared at the live shows, was never transferred to the television series. He was dropped for unknown reasons, and despite many press articles regarding the incident, no reason for his departure was ever given.
 During the third season in 1994, Panther (Helen O'Reilly) suffered one of the worst injuries seen on the show when she fell from her platform during Tilt and severely injured her back. She returned to the show later in the season and remained with the show for a further two years before retiring permanently.
 After the third season in 1994, a newspaper uncovered evidence that Shadow (Jefferson King) had taken steroids. King later confirmed the rumours were true and was sacked shortly afterwards.  In 2021 he was jailed for 6 years  for the kidnapping, beating, and false imprisonment of Aaron Ali.
 Season five became known as the "season of injury". Before filming started Jet (Diane Youdale) retired after being injured during a live show in Sheffield on Pyramid. This led to the event being dropped for the upcoming season five. Amazon (Sharron Davies) severely injured her knee during training and had to retire from the show (she did however appear on all publicity material for this season). Laser was brought in as a replacement and even used the same costume but with minor changes. Laser made her debut in the fifth episode. Zodiac's (Kate Staples) appearances were limited to only 2, both on Danger Zone, due to an injury on Pole Axe during training. She retired permanently the following year. Nightshade (Judy Simpson) made only sparse outings during the season due to a severe virus picked up the previous year in Australia during filming for the first Ashes series. She had to be helped off after a game of Skytrak by the training team and her final appearance came when beaten on her speciality event, Duel, the only defeat she suffered during domestic competition.
 Also during the fifth series in 1996, it was reported by the media that Hunter (James Crossley) and presenter Ulrika Jonsson were in a relationship. Although heavily denied at the time, Jonsson later admitted it in her 2003 biography.
 After the sixth season in 1997, Warrior (Michael Ahearne) was sacked from the show.

Format changes and demise
Season seven (1998) saw an overhaul; two new male Gladiators joined the team, Diesel and Vulcan. Vulcan was the "bad boy" of the Australian version of the show and was brought in to be a rival for Wolf. Behind the scenes aspects were added including clips of the contenders selections and training as well as clips showing the contenders choosing which Gladiator they would face on a certain game via coin toss. Three new games were introduced; Catapult, Dogfight and Vertigo. This was the most new events introduced in a single season since 1994. However, all three failed to go down well with viewers. As well as the three new games, three established events (Powerball, Pendulum and Gauntlet) had rule changes.

Another change was the Gladiators' costumes; the emblems (bow for Hunter, playing cards for Ace etc.) were removed and a standardised outfit was brought in: red for females and blue for males. The actual "cut" of each gladiator costume remained the same from the previous season. The basic design was part of the word "Gladiators" written in black on each outfit.

Despite the changes, viewing figures continued to drop and the series was axed on 11 February 1999. However, LWT agreed to film another four episodes for ONdigital, the recently launched digital terrestrial television platform. These episodes were filmed in spring 1999 and saw the return of original host John Fashanu. These consisted of a three-part mini-series which saw previous winners compete to be crowned "Supreme Gladiators Champion" and a one off special entitled "Battle of the Giants" where male gladiators competed against each other for the title of "Ultimate Gladiator". The honour went to Hunter (James Crossley).

Similarly to the very first series, each episode more or less contained the same games - Powerball, The Wall (female contenders), Swingshot (male contenders), Gauntlet, Hang Tough and Duel, the only changes were that the male contenders played Atlaspheres instead of Swingshot in the second heat and Whiplash was played instead of Gauntlet in the Battle of the Giants special.

The four episodes were first broadcast back-to-back on 29 May 1999 on First ONdigital, an exclusive free channel on the ONdigital platform for special events and programmes. The episodes were then shown nationally on the ITV network over the Christmas season, across four successive Saturday nights from 11 December 1999 to 1 January 2000. The ITV broadcast of the final episode on Millennium Day 2000 attracted just over six million viewers.

Transmissions

Domestic

International

The Ashes

Springbok Challenge

Live shows
For four years a series of 'live' shows were played in the Spring ahead of the recording of the televised series. These shows were used to roadtest new event concepts and new Gladiators.

1993
Venue: Wembley Arena, London, England
Presenters: John Fashanu and Ulrika Jonsson
Female Gladiators: Flame, Jet, Lightning, Panther, Phoenix, Scorpio, Zodiac
Male Gladiators: Bullit, Cobra, Hawk, Saracen, Shadow, Trojan, Warrior, Wolf
Referee: John Anderson
Timekeeper: Andrew Norgate
Dates: 26–28 March

The first set of live shows was used to roadtest three new potential events ahead of the televised series. One of the events, Tilt, would be used in the televised series with little modification. Joust was also roadtested in this series with pugil sticks being used but the sybikes were much larger and lower to the ground than the events ultimate appearance in the televised series. A third new event taken from the American series, Breakthrough And Conquer, was also roadtested but would not be taken forward. An 'updated version' of Duel on a rocking suspension bridge using pugil sticks was also played and this format would be modified and played as a new game called Suspension Bridge in the 1993 televised series. Atlaspheres, The Wall and the Eliminator were also played.

Three new Gladiators, Bullit, Trojan and Zodiac were included in these shows. For unknown reasons Bullit did not appear in the televised series (though would finally appear in a Legends episode of the 2008 revival series). These shows would be the last to feature Flame, Phoenix and Hawk who were dropped before the 1993 televised series.

Some of the contenders from these shows went on to be in the televised shows. One of the contenders, Tammy Baker, would later become a Gladiator, Fox, from 1997 onwards.

Highlights from these shows were shown in a preview episode to the 1993 series and whilst footage of him playing was included, there was no specific reference to Bullit (or Flame, Phoenix and Hawk).

1994
Venue: Wembley Arena, London, England
Presenters: John Fashanu and Ulrika Jonsson
Female Gladiators: Falcon, Jet, Lightning, Nightshade, Panther, Scorpio, Zodiac
Male Gladiators: Cobra, Hunter, Saracen, Shadow, Trojan, Warrior, Wolf
Referee: John Anderson
Timekeeper: Derek Redmond

This set of live shows saw the entire 1993 team return. Cobra suffered an ankle injury during the shows and had to be sidelined. Only one new event was roadtested in this series, Cannonball Run, which was later used in the 1994 televised series under the name Hit & Run. Atlaspheres, The Wall, Powerball, Hang Tough, Duel and The Eliminator were also played.

Some of the contenders from these shows went on to be in the televised shows.

1995
Venue: Sheffield Arena, Sheffield, South Yorkshire, England
Presenters: John Fashanu and Ulrika Jonsson
Female Gladiators: Blaze, Falcon, Jet, Lightning, Nightshade, Panther, Vogue, Zodiac
Male Gladiators: Cobra, Hunter, Raider, Rhino, Saracen, Trojan, Warrior, Wolf
Referee: John Anderson
Timekeeper: Andrew Norgate

Four new Gladiators were introduced in these shows over Easter 1995, with Raider, Rhino and Vogue going on to take part in The Ashes series in Brisbane shortly afterwards before taking part in the 1995 televised series. The third new Gladiator, Blaze, was the 1994 female champion and International Gladiators 1 champion Eunice Huthart. However following these shows, Huthart wanted to compete as a UK challenger for The Ashes series and stepped down as a Gladiator.

Unlike the other live shows, these shows took place in Sheffield Arena which was smaller than Wembley Arena. Pendulum had been intended to be roadtested in these shows but the arena was too small to fit the safety net. Instead Joust was played despite it being one of the least used events in the televised series and only making one appearance in the 1995 televised series before being axed. Powerball, Pyramid and Atlaspheres were also played, with Saracen injuring his knee during Powerball.

1996
Venue: Wembley Arena, London, England
Presenters: John Fashanu and Ulrika Jonsson
Female Gladiators: Amazon, Falcon, Jet, Lightning, Nightshade, Panther, Rebel, Rio, Vogue, Zodiac
Male Gladiators: Ace, Cobra, Hunter, Rhino, Saracen, Trojan, Warrior, Wolf
Referee: John Anderson
Timekeeper: Andrew Norgate
Dates: 11–14 April
Number of shows: 7

The final set of live shows saw the introduction of Ace, Rebel and Rio as Gladiators – all of whom would go on to appear in that years televised series. Jet would suffer an injury during Pyramid in which she fell awkwardly trapping nerves in her neck and she retired from competition after this event. Amazon, who herself had picked up an injury on Pyramid to her knee, would quit between these shows and the 1996 televised series. Pyramid itself would be axed following both these injuries and a leg injury to Rhino during filming of the event on International Gladiators 2 the year before.

Sumo Ball was roadtested in these shows and would feature as the only new event of the 1996 televised series. Other events played were Atlaspheres, Powerball, Gauntlet, Hang Tough and the Eliminator.

Royal Tournaments
In 1997 and 1998 a short segment of Gladiators was introduced to the Royal Tournament event at Earls Court after London Weekend Television won the broadcasting rights from the BBC. Duel would feature in the 1997 Royal Tournament and Pursuit featured in the 1998 Royal Tournament despite it having been axed after the 1996 series. Hunter was the only gladiator to take part in the 1997 Royal Tournament (since Duel was his best event). For its Royal Tournament appearance, Pursuit saw a ten-second headstart (rather than three) for the contenders with the course being a sprint round a cone, web trap (over), low wall, web trap (under), hand ladder, high wall, sprint round a cone, spaghetti junction (used in the Eliminator in 1996) and sprint finish. The balance beam and wire bridge from the televised series course were not used. Fox, Rocket, Khan and Hunter took part in the shows despite Rocket and Khan not appearing in the 1998 series and the Gladiators (except Hunter) not having had chance to play Pursuit in the televised series.

Merchandise
During the show's first three seasons, popular model makers Hornby made a selection of action figures and playsets based on the show.

The first wave of figures consisted of Jet (B800), Shadow (B801), Wolf (B802), Saracen (B803), Cobra (B804), Warrior (B805) and generic figures of a Male Contender (B806) and Female Contender (B807). The first wave of playsets included Duel (B821, which contained American-style Ramrods), Atlasphere Attack (B822, which contained a yellow Atlasphere and a Wolf figure), Danger Zone (B823, with Warrior figure), Atlasphere Challenge (B824, blue and red Atlaspheres with Cobra and Male Contender figures), Super Duel (B825, with Shadow and Male Contender figures), and The Ultimate Challenge (B826, which contains all of the above). B823 was due to include a Hawk Action figure, but due to his departure from the show, a figure was never released.

The second wave of figures included Trojan (B815), Hunter (B816), Zodiac (B817) and Panther (B818), as well as revised versions of Jet (B800) and Wolf (B802). A second wave of playsets included The Wall (B827).

A final wave of figures were released for the first International Gladiators series. These consisted of a revised version of Hunter, and figures of Hawk (United States), Terminator (Finland) and Dynamite (Russia). In 1995, McDonald's gave away an exclusive range of figures through a Happy Meal promotion. These consisted of new models of Trojan, Wolf, Jet, Lightning, and the previously unreleased Rhino. Notably, many of the moulds for the Hornby series were shipped over to Australia, and reused for a range of Australian Gladiators figures. While the Male Contender remained the same, Taipan has an identical head to Wolf, and Vulcan shares an identical head to Saracen. Figures of Tower, Commander, Condor and Hammer were also released, along with an identical 'Duel' playset.

Along with these popular models and play sets everything from plates to clocks were released. Two CD and Audio Tape compilations were released during the early years of the show, containing tracks such as Holding Out for a Hero, We Are Family & The Boys Are Back in Town, as well as the instrumental music used during events and a 3 Minute version of the programme's opening theme song.

VHS releases 
During the show's first four series, a number of VHSes were released by Clear Vision (with some released through their Silver Vision label). These contained episodes, specials or other material exclusive for home release. Many quickly sold out and are rare. The following VHS releases are available:

 GL001 – Into the Arena – Contains Heats 1 and 2 from Series 1 (1992)
 GL002 – Powerplay – Contains Heats 3 and 4 from Series 1 (1992)
 GL003 – The Conflict – Contains Heats 5 and 6 from Series 1 (1992)
 GL004 – Countdown – Contains Semi-finals 1 and 2 from Series 1 (1992)
 GL005 – The Ultimate Challenge – Contains the Grand Final from Series 1 (1992)
 GL006 – The Very Best of Gladiators – Contains the special episode "The Challenge of the Gladiators" (1993)
 GL007 – Gladiators Return – Contains the special episode "Return of the Gladiators" (1993)
 GL008 – Contenders Ready, Gladiators Ready – Contains Heats 1 and 2 from Series 2 (1993)
 GL009 – Arena Attack – Contains Heats 3, 4 and 5 from Series 2 (1993)
 GL010 – Battleground – Contains Heats 6, 7 and 8 from Series 2 (1993)
 GL011 – Combat – Contains Quarter Finals 1–4 from Series 2 (1993)
 GL012 – The Ultimate Challenge '93 – Contains Semi-finals 1 and 2 and the Grand Final from Series 2, plus the special episode "The Battle of the Gladiators" (1993)
 GL013 – The Climax – Contains Semi-finals 1 and 2 plus the Grand Final from Series 3 (1994), plus footage from the "International Challenge of Champions I" (1993)
 GL014 – The Gladiators Challenge '94–'95 – Contains the special episodes "The Return", "The Celebrity Challenge" and "The Fighting Forces Challenge" (1994)
 GL015 – International Gladiators: The Showdown – Contains Semi Finals 1 and 2 plus the Grand Final from International Gladiators I (1994)
 GL016 – The Power To Win – Contains the special episode "The Power To Win" (1995)
 SV001 – Jet: A Video Profile – Contains the special episode "Jet: A Video Profile" (1995)

BBC revival 
In July 2022, it was reported that the BBC were in talks with Metro-Goldwyn-Mayer, who hold the rights to the original format, to relaunch the show on BBC One. According to sources the BBC plans to relaunch the series in 2023, with filming taking place in Sheffield, northern England. In August 2022, it was confirmed that the format would return to British television in 2023 and would be produced by Hungry Bear Media and MGM Television. In addition, this will be the second time the show has been rebooted since the first revival aired on Sky One in 2008.

References

External links 
 Gladiators - Official Website
 The GladPod the Gladiators Podcast
 
 Gladiators at BFI
 International Gladiators at BFI
 Gladiators – The Ashes at BFI
 

 
1992 British television series debuts
2000 British television series endings
ITV game shows
English-language television shows
London Weekend Television shows
Television series by ITV Studios
British television series based on American television series
British television series revived after cancellation